The 2021 IFA Shield was the 124th edition of the IFA Shield. It had 1 Indian Super League team, 5 I-League teams and 10 Calcutta Premier Division teams. Real Kashmir are the defending champions.

Teams

Group stage

Group A

Group B

Group C

Group D

Knockout stage

Bracket

Pre Quarter-finals

Quarterfinals

Semi-final

Final

Statistics

Top goal scorers

References 

IFA Shield seasons
2021 domestic association football cups